Hmong cuisine is the cuisine of the Hmong people of China, Southeast Asia and the Hmong American community in the United States. The vast majority of dishes that make up the Hmong cuisine are not actually unique to Hmong communities but rather blends of culinary dishes found in hosting states of Hmong migration. While remaining stateless after their expulsion by the Han clan of Ancient China, the Hmong have adopted staple dishes from various cuisines during their migration as their own, such as dishes of the Lao, Thai, Vietnamese and Chinese cuisines.

Overview
Hmong cuisine varies somewhat by region.

For example, in Hmong communities in the United States, a Hmong dish may be largely based on a dish of a larger Asian ethnicity that also resides in the local community, such as the Chinese, Lao, Vietnamese, or Thai. As many ethnic Hmong have passed through Laos & Thailand en route to their final destinations around the world and many still reside there, Lao cuisine has influenced parts of Hmong cuisine.

While the modification of ingredients in adopted dishes is generally minimal, preparation might be shortened as it would in a mountainous setting where many individuals in a given village need to be fed. In urban settings around the world where public eating establishments are common, most Hmong dishes resemble other available Asian dishes. One major difference is that the addition of extra condiments is encouraged. An example of this is the addition of large amounts of white sugar and soy sauce to pho, a hearty soup considered to be the national dish of Vietnam.

As the Hmong language was not widely written until the 1950s, Hmong cuisine has been, until recently, passed on by elders of the community. Any actual Hmong dishes are purely of oral tradition and can vary from clan to clan or family to family. These differences are largely based on the country of residence and available resources. While Hmong restaurants are extremely rare in Asia, they have become more popular in the countries of Hmong diaspora. While such establishments are generally owned by members of the Hmong community, menu items are generally not identifiable as a part of a cuisine specific to the Hmong. 

However, it is common to find popular East and Southeast Asian dishes labeled as "Hmong" in such establishments. For example, "Hmong Chicken Wings" are commonly found on appetizer menus in Hmong restaurants. In this dish, the chicken is general marinaded in most of the spices used in other dishes preferred by the Hmong. In recent years, Hmong cuisine has enjoyed a rise in popularity in areas where truly authentic Asian restaurants are limited. This is largely a result of increased acceptance of the Hmong in their new communities.

Ingredients 

The Hmong staple food is white rice, which is usually eaten with a variety of vegetables, hot pepper (often in the form of a Southeast Asian-inspired sauce) and boiled or fried meat if it is available. Sticky (glutinous) rice—either white or purple—is commonly served at gatherings and on other special occasions. Hmong cuisine is characterized by the use of a wide variety of spices and herbs found in the Vietnamese, Thai, and Laotian cuisines, including hot pepper (usually Thai), lemongrass, cilantro, garlic, green onions, mint, galangal, and ginger. Fish sauce, oyster sauce, soy sauce, sriracha sauce, and hoisin sauce are also used prevalently.

Egg rolls
Traditional "Hmong" egg rolls can be culturally tied back to Vietnamese egg rolls during their migration across Asia. These fried and flour wrapped rolls can be found at family events and annual events such as the Hmong New Year. The Hmong community of Rhode Island holds an annual fundraiser by selling traditional Hmong egg rolls. 

Each family has their own recipe, but typically the rolls consist of eggs mixed with shredded carrots and cabbage, ground pork, onions, scallions, and cilantro. These are seasoned with oyster sauce, rolled in a paper-thin wheat shell, and deep fried.

Meals 
Hmong people typically eat three meals a day and do not usually snack in between meals. Each meal includes white rice and usually vegetables and a smaller portion of meat. The meat and vegetables are usually stir fried, steamed or boiled. Hot pepper (kua txob) is usually served as a side at most meals, as it is in many other Asian cuisines. The types of food prepared for different mealtimes do not vary widely, although more preparation is typically put into breakfast and dinner. This is due to the common shortage of ingredients throughout the migrant past of the Hmong. This is something that has been accepted and embraced by the Hmong. Meals are eaten in a communal manner with food being placed in the center. For large cultural gatherings the men eat first, followed by the women and children. This is only true to those who still hold on to traditional Hmong customs.

Naab Vaam 
Naab Vaam (pronounced as Nah-vah) is a traditional Hmong drink that is occasionally served during special events. In English, it can sometimes be called Tri-Color. Naab Vaam is a sweetend dessert drink that consists of coconut, tapioca pearls, cendol, and many other toppings that are mixed in.
In Hmong culture, it is essential to have toppings such as colored chestnuts, jello, sweet fruit, and grass jelly. Most of these toppings can be made from scratch by using sugar, coconut milk, and rice flour.

See also
 Hmong People
 Hmong customs and culture

References